Kabaçam, a.k.a. Kabaşam, is an archaeological site of a historic settlement in Mersin Province, southern Turkey.

Geography
Hisarin Castle, another historical ruin to the south can be viewed from the site. The road runs within the settlement while most of the ruins are situated just at the west of the road.

The site
The original name and the history of the settlement is not known. However, it is dated to late Roman or early Byzantine era.

Among the ruins, there are a basilica-plan church, houses, olive production workshops and a tower. There are reliefs of grapes and a relief of Hercules. In the necropolis, there are Ottoman tombs in addition to khamasorion-type sarcophagi. Originally, there was also a Roman road to the south, which is now almost lost in the dense scrub.

References

Erdemli District
Archaeological sites in Mersin Province, Turkey
Roman sites in Turkey